Pic d'Anie (Basque Auñamendi) is a mountain of the Pyrenees in France, located close to the Spanish border.

The mountain boasts an almost perfect pyramidal shape and is surrounded by the spectacular karst landscape of. Larra, in the Larra-Belagua massif (Navarre).

The three main access routes to the peak are: Belagua in Spain and  Pierre-Saint Martin and Lescun in the French department of  Pyrénées-Atlantiques.

References
 El Correo (Spanish)

Mountains of Pyrénées-Atlantiques
Mountains of the Pyrenees
Two-thousanders of France
Nouvelle-Aquitaine region articles needing translation from French Wikipedia